Court Nunatak is a nunatak  long which rises to , standing close east of the mouth of Meinardus Glacier on the west side of New Bedford Inlet, on the east coast of Palmer Land. It was discovered and photographed from the air in December 1940 by members of East Base of the United States Antarctic Service (USAS). During 1947 it was photographed from the air by members of the Ronne Antarctic Research Expedition, who in conjunction with the Falkland Islands Dependencies Survey (FIDS) charted it from the ground. It was named by the FIDS for Arnold Court, an American meteorologist and member of the West Base unit of the USAS, 1939–41.

References 

Nunataks of Palmer Land